Day After Day may refer to:

 "Day After Day" (Badfinger song)
 Day After Day: Live, a 1990 album by Badfinger
 "Day After Day (The Show Must Go On)", a song by The Alan Parsons Project from I Robot
 "Day After Day" (Def Leppard song), 2000
 "Day After Day" (Elnur Hüseynov and Samir Javadzadeh song)
 "Dag efter dag" (English: "Day after day"), a song by Chips
 "Day After Day", a song by Exo from Obsession
 "Day After Day", a song by Haji's Kitchen
 "Day After Day", a song by Hooverphonic from Hooverphonic Presents Jackie Cane
 "Day After Day", a song by Julian Lennon from Photograph Smile
 "Day After Day", a song by The Pretenders from Pretenders II
 "Day After Day (It's Slippin' Away)", a song by Shango
 "Day After Day", a song by the Vels from Velocity
 Day After Day (1943 film) (Russian: Den za Dnyom), a Russian film with a screenplay by Aleksei Kapler
 Day After Day (1998 film) (Hebrew: Yom Yom), an Israeli film starring Moshe Ivgy
 Day After Day (film), a 1962 Canadian documentary film

See also
 Day by Day (disambiguation)